Vass or VASS can refer to:

People
 Ádám Vass, Hungarian footballer currently playing for Brescia Calcio
 Baillie Vass, a nickname given to Alec Douglas-Home by Private Eye magazine
 Ghizela Vass, Romanian communist activist and politician
 Joan Vass (1925-2011), American fashion designer.
 Márta Vass, Hungarian long-distance runner

Other uses
 Vass, North Carolina, a town
 Vector addition system with states, a mathematical modeling language
 Vass of Lochslin, Scottish family

Surnames from status names
Occupational surnames

Hungarian-language surnames